Oakwood is a  historic house at Harwood, Anne Arundel County, Maryland.  It was built in the 1850s and is a -story, frame vernacular farmhouse with Greek Revival influenced details. It is a highly intact, mid-19th-century tobacco plantation dwelling and is associated with Sprigg Harwood, a leader in the failed initiative to have Maryland leave the Union and align with the newly formed Confederate States of America.

It was listed on the National Register of Historic Places in 2001.

See also
Maryland in the American Civil War
Tulip Hill

References

External links
, including photo from 1999, at Maryland Historical Trust

Houses on the National Register of Historic Places in Maryland
Houses in Anne Arundel County, Maryland
Greek Revival houses in Maryland
Colonial Revival architecture in Maryland
Plantation houses in Maryland
National Register of Historic Places in Anne Arundel County, Maryland